Welaung, also known as Rawngtu Chin, is a purported Kuki-Chin-Mizo languages of Burma. It is spoken in Mindat township, Chin State, as well as in 2 villages of Htilin township, Magway Region (Ethnologue).

Dialects are Kyonnam, Welaung, Boishi, and Shitwanu.

References

See also
Taungtha people
Welaung language

Kuki-Chin languages